Očová is a village and municipality of the Zvolen District in the Banská Bystrica Region of Slovakia.

Official name
1773, 1873–1902 Ocsova, 1786 Ocschowa, 1808 Ocsova, Očowá, 1863 Ocsová, 1907–1913 Nagyócsa, 1920– Očová

Famous people
Matej Bel, scholar and polymath
Erzsébet Cseszneky, Hungarian noble lady, benefactor of the Lutheran Church, Matej Bel's mother
Ján Poničan, Slovak poet and novelist
Jozef Moravčík, Slovak diplomat

References

External links
 
 

Villages and municipalities in Zvolen District